Pat Crawford Brown (June 29, 1929July 2, 2019) was an American actress.

Life and career
Brown married Calvin B. Brown on January 3, 1961, and they remained married until his death in 1976. They had one daughter, Charlotte Brown Swanson.

She began acting in her 50s after a long career as an English teacher. She taught English literature during the 1960s and 1970s at Carson High School in Carson, California. On television, she is best known for her role as Ida Greenberg in  Desperate Housewives (2004–2007). She also had recurring roles on daytime soap operas General Hospital and Days of Our Lives. She has appeared in feature films, including Sister Act and Sister Act 2: Back in the Habit.

Brown was a resident of the Motion Picture & Television Country House and Hospital in Woodland Hills, California, where she died on July 2, 2019, at the age of 90.

Selected filmography

The Twilight Zone (1986, TV Series) as Mrs. Finnegan (segment "The Little People of Killany Woods")
Sledge Hammer! (1987, TV Series) as Woman at Bar
Beauty and the Beast (1987, TV Series) as Old Woman #1
L.A. Law (1987, TV Series) as Jury Foreman #2
Highway to Heaven (1987, TV Series) as Betty
Who's the Boss? (1988, TV Series) as Mary
18 Again! (1988) as Old Lady
Elvira, Mistress of the Dark (1988) as Mrs. Meeker
Liberace: Behind the Music (1988, TV Movie) as Nancy
Cannibal Women in the Avocado Jungle of Death (1989) as Secretary
Moonlighting (1989, TV Series) as Cleaning Lady
Dear John (1989, TV Series) as Kirk's Mom
Mama's Family (1989, TV Series) as Joanne Mickley
The Famous Teddy Z (1989, TV Series) 
Murder, She Wrote (1989-1992, TV Series) as Cashier / Woman
Coach (1989-1997, TV Series) as Secretary / Mrs. Alma Thorkelson
Designing Women (1990, TV Series) as Constance Pine
Knots Landing (1990, TV Series) as Owner
False Identity (1990) as Nellie
Out of Sight, Out of Mind (1990) as Nurse
A Gnome Named Gnorm (1990) as Female Mourner
Murphy Brown (1990-1995, TV Series) as Sister Mary Margaret O'Brien
Dream On (1990, TV Series) as Frieda
Quantum Leap (1990, TV Series) as Woman
Carol & Company (1990, TV Series) as Miss Underwood
Matlock (1991, TV Series) as Old Woman
Get a Life (1991, TV Series) as Aunt Molly
Growing Pains (1991, TV Series) as Kathleen
Amen (1991, TV Series) as Winnie
The Rocketeer (1991) as Mrs. Pye
Wild Orchid II: Two Shades of Blue (1991) as Ms. Earlane
Demonic Toys (1992) as Mrs. Michaels
Empty Nest (1992, TV Series) as Melba
Sister Act (1992) as Choir Nun #3
Love Is Like That (1992) as Woman in pink
Bodies of Evidence (1992, TV Series) as Mrs. Polk
Middle Ages (1992, TV Series)
Step by Step (1992, TV Series) as Mrs. Hill
The Wonder Years (1992, TV Series) as Mrs. Ruebner
Dinosaurs (1992, TV Series) as Stenographer (voice)
Camp Wilder (1993, TV Series) as Aunt Ida
Reasonable Doubts (1993, TV Series) as Mrs. McGurdy
Homefront (1993, TV Series)
Love & War (1993, TV Series) as Mrs. Kittock
Bakersfield P.D. (1993, TV Series) as Woman
Time Trax (1993, TV Series) as Paul's Wife
Sister Act 2: Back in the Habit (1993) as Choir Nun #3
Days of Our Lives (1993-2009, TV Series) as Sister Agnes / Minnie
Reality Bites (1994) as Cashier
Tom (1994, TV Series) as Miss Broch
Little Giants (1994) as Louise
Sister, Sister (1994-1995, TV Series) as Ms. Little / Maid
The Fresh Prince of Bel-Air (1994-1996, TV Series) as Lady / Nurse
Mad About You (1994, TV Series) as Neighbor #1
Hearts Afire (1995, TV Series) as Landlady
Lois & Clark: The New Adventures of Superman (1995, TV Series) as Mrs. Macarthy
Married... with Children (1995, TV Series) as Bingo Caller
Kirk (1995, TV Series) as Aunt Zelda
Deadly Games (1996, TV Series) as Woman
The Crew (1996, TV Series) as Ida
Home Improvement (1996, TV Series) as Mrs. Kluzewski
ER (1996, TV Series) as Mrs. Votey
The Faculty (1996, TV Series) as Alice Munson
Ellen (1996, TV Series) as Rose
Unhappily Ever After (1996, TV Series) as Sadie Glickstein
Dark Skies (1996, TV Series) as Clarice Brown, Hotel Clerk
The Pretender (1996, TV Series) as Millie Reynolds
Beverly Hills, 90210 (1996, TV Series) as Salvation Army Soldier
The John Larroquette Show (1996, TV Series) as Chris' Mom
Chicago Sons (1997, TV Series) as Woman
Profiler (1997, TV Series) as Sister Mary
Soul Man (1997, TV Series) as Gladys
Romy and Michele's High School Reunion (1997) as Truck Stop Waitress
George & Leo (1997, TV Series)
Caroline in the City (1997, TV Series) as Sadie
Suddenly Susan (1997-1999, TV Series) as Mildred / Freida
NYPD Blue (1997-2000, TV Series) as Old Woman / Mrs. Klein
Alright Already (1997, TV Series) as Lina
Night Man (1997, TV Series) as Mrs. Simon
Johnny Skidmarks (1998) as Mrs. Starkey
Fired Up (1998, TV Series) as Sister Mary Grace
Something So Right (1998, TV Series) as Mrs. Van Owl
Beyond Belief: Fact or Fiction (1998, TV Series) as Annie
The Brian Benben Show (1998, TV Series) as Heddy Bolinski
The Godson (1998) as Toenail Lady
DiResta (1998, TV Series) as Grandma Wooly-Hat
Guys Like Us (1998, TV Series) as Mary
Jack Frost (1998) as Scorekeeper
L.A. Doctors (1998, TV Series) as Old Lady Patient
Johnny Skidmarks (1998)
Two Guys, a Girl and a Pizza Place (1999, TV Series) as Librarian
Forces of Nature (1999) as Florence
Norm (1999, TV Series) as Mrs. Lefkowitz
Grown Ups (1999, TV Series) as The Elderly Woman
Malcolm & Eddie (1999, TV Series) as Peeping Tonya
One World (1999, TV Series) as Mrs. Annandale
The Drew Carey Show (1999, TV Series) as Mrs. Hopkins
3rd Rock from the Sun (2000, TV Series) as Mrs. Larson
Judging Amy (2000-2002, TV Series) as Waitress Polly / Waitress Louise
Playing Mona Lisa (2000) as Grandma Ida Weinberg
The Woman Every Man Wants (2001)
The Division (2001, TV Series) as Pappy
Nikki (2001, TV Series) as Mrs. Hiebaum
These Old Broads (2001, TV Movie) as Miriam Hodges
State of Grace (2001, TV Series)
Danny (2001, TV Series) as Mrs. Landis
The Medicine Show (2001) as Crickety Nurse
The Steve Harvey Show (2001, TV Series) as Ms. Hirschfeld
The Proud Family (2001, TV Series) as Agnus (voice)
Lizzie McGuire (2002, TV Series) as Mrs. Robinson
Buffy the Vampire Slayer (2002, TV Series) as Old Lady
MDs (2002, TV Series) as Very Old Woman
Gilmore Girls (2002-2004, TV Series) as Mrs. Cassini
A.U.S.A. (2003, TV Series) as Grandmother
Daredevil (2003) as Old Lady on Plane
The Bernie Mac Show (2003, TV Series)
Stuck on You (2003) as Mimmy
Memron (2004, TV Movie) as Mrs. Westerfeld
Monk (2004, TV Series) as Nana Parlo
Arrested Development (2004, TV Series) as Old Woman
According to Jim (2004, TV Series) as Mrs. Reifschneider
Strong Medicine (2004, TV Series) as Millie - Pharmacist
Desperate Housewives (2004-2007, TV Series) as Ida Greenberg
Jack & Bobby (2005, TV Series) as Old Lady
Suits on the Loose (2005) as Sister Cutbank
Crazylove (2005) as Old Lady
Emily's Reasons Why Not (2006, TV Mini-Series) as Grandma Beatrice
You, Me and Dupree (2006) as Aunt Kathy
El Cortez (2006) as Helena
The War at Home (2006, TV Series) as Kathy
CSI: Crime Scene Investigation (2007, TV Series) as Female Dental Patient
Norbit (2007) as Mrs. Henderson
Ghost Whisperer (2007, TV Series) as Bertha
Raines (2007, TV Series) as Margo, Glaucoma sufferer
General Hospital: Night Shift (2007, TV Series) as Mrs. Storch
Family Guy (2007, TV Series) as Lead Sanka Dancer
10 Items or Less (2008, TV Series) as Mrs. Brown
Uncross the Stars (2008) as Norma
Dark Streets (2008) as Delores
Swingtown (2008, TV Series) as Norma
General Hospital (2008, TV Series) as Mrs. Albright
It's Always Sunny in Philadelphia (2008, TV Series) as Woman - Historical Society
Numb3rs (2008, TV Series) as Older Woman
How I Met Your Mother (2009, TV Series) as Thelma
Meteor (2009, TV Mini-Series) as Elderly Lady
Super Capers (2009) as Gertrude
Saving Grace (2009, TV Series) as Ethel Mae Wilson
Labor Pains (2009) as Aunt Betty
Mending Fences (2009, TV Movie) as County Clerk
Community (2010, TV Series) as Pierce's Mom (voice)
Parks and Recreation (2011, TV Series) as Andy's Grandma
Mad Love (2011, TV Series) as Ruth
Rules of Engagement (2011, TV Series) as Pearl
Oliver's Ghost (2011, TV Movie) as Betty
Bones (2011, TV Series) as Landlady
2ND Take (2011) as Miriam
Divorce Invitation (2012) as Myrtle

Other
Wainy Days (2011, internet series) as Patricia
L.A. Noire (2011, Video Game) as Florence Jenkins (voice)

References

External links

1929 births
2019 deaths
Actresses from New York City
Schoolteachers from California
American women educators
American film actresses
American soap opera actresses
American television actresses
21st-century American women